San Bartolomeo may refer to:

Places in Italy 
 San Bartolomeo al Mare
 San Bartolomeo in Galdo
 San Bartolomeo Val Cavargna

Churches in Italy 
 Santi Bartolomeo e Gaetano, Bologna
 San Bartolomeo in Pantano, Pistoia
 San Bartolomeo all'Isola, Rome
 San Bartolomeo, Venice
 Church of San Bartolomeo (Barberino Val d'Elsa), Barberino Val d'Elsa